Joseph S. Fleming (October 1, 1883 – November 1, 1960) was an American track and field athlete who competed in the 1904 Summer Olympics. In 1904 he was fourth in 400 m competition.

References

External links
list of American athletes
Joseph Fleming's profile at Sports Reference.com

1883 births
1960 deaths
American male sprinters
Olympic track and field athletes of the United States
Athletes (track and field) at the 1904 Summer Olympics